is a railway station on the Tokyu Den-en-toshi Line in the eastern part of Setagaya, Tokyo, Japan, operated by the private railway operator Tokyu Corporation. The station is named after Komazawa University, which is close-by.

Lines
Komazawa-daigaku Station is served by the Tokyu Den-en-toshi Line from Shibuya Station in Tokyo. It is numbered "DT04".

Station layout
Komazawa-daigaku Station has one underground island platform serving two tracks.

Platforms

History
The station opened on April 7, 1977. It was named after Komazawa University.

Surrounding area
 Komazawa University
 Komazawa Olympic Park
 National Hospital Organization Tokyo Medical Center
 National Route 246

See also
 List of railway stations in Japan

External links

 Tokyu station information 

Railway stations in Tokyo
Komazawa University
Railway stations in Japan opened in 1977